The Nuclear Protection Corps is a unit of the Islamic Revolutionary Guard Corps tasked to protect the Iranian nuclear facilities. It was announced on March 16, 2022, after several acts of sabotage against these sites.

References

Islamic Revolutionary Guard Corps
Military units and formations established in 2022
2021 establishments in Iran
Nuclear program of Iran